João Carlos Batista Pinheiro, Pinheiro (January 13, 1932 in Campos dos Goytacazes – August 30, 2011), was a Brazilian footballer who achieved notoriety playing for Fluminense and the Brazil national football team. He was arguably the player with most appearances for Fluminense in the club's history, with 605 matches in total.

Honours
 Fluminense
 Campeonato Carioca: 1951, 1959
 Copa Rio: 1952
 Torneio Rio-São Paulo: 1957, 1960
 Brazil
 Panamerican Championship: 1952
 Bernardo O'Higgins Cup: 1955

References

External links

1932 births
2011 deaths
People from Campos dos Goytacazes
Brazilian footballers
Brazilian football managers
1954 FIFA World Cup players
Campeonato Brasileiro Série A players
Campeonato Brasileiro Série A managers
Americano Futebol Clube players
Fluminense FC players
Esporte Clube Bahia players
Fluminense FC managers
Clube Náutico Capibaribe managers
Americano Futebol Clube managers
Goytacaz Futebol Clube managers
Bangu Atlético Clube managers
America Football Club (RJ) managers
Botafogo de Futebol e Regatas managers
América Futebol Clube (MG) managers
Cruzeiro Esporte Clube managers
Association football defenders
Brazil international footballers
Sportspeople from Rio de Janeiro (state)